Tabala or Tabalah may refer to:

Places 
 Tabala (Lydia)
 
 Tabalah, Saudi Arabia
 Tabalah, Yemen
 Tabala, Jonava (Lithuania)

Other uses 
 Tabla, an Indian percussion instrument